Veikko Ennala (9 October 1922 – 29 August 1991) was a Finnish journalist. His best-known work was for the magazine Hymy, published by Urpo Lahtinen.

The journalist character in the Risto Jarva film Kun taivas putoaa is transparently based on Veikko Ennala.

External links
Veikko Ennala @ pHinnWeb
Erään aiheen harrastajan tutkimus Ennalasta

1922 births
1991 deaths
People from Mänttä-Vilppula
Finnish military personnel of World War II
20th-century Finnish journalists